The 2014–15 season was Brighton & Hove Albion Football Club's 4th consecutive season in the Championship.

Brighton entered this season having finished in a play-off position in both seasons prior, twice going out in the semi-finals. A new manager, Sami Hyypiä, had been appointed following Óscar Garcia's resignation in the previous season after bowing out of the play-offs to Derby County. A sense of optimism presided the beginning of the season, however it would have a drastically different outcome than was anticipated, as Brighton languished towards the bottom of the Championship table for much of the campaign. A very poor first half of the season, in which Brighton had only won three out of their first 23 games and at one point had gone on an 11-game winless run, culminated in manager Hyypia's demise by December, with the Seagulls in the relegation zone at the time of his dismissal. Chris Hughton was swiftly appointed as the new manager, and he was able to steady the ship in the second half of the season, guiding Brighton to 20th position in the league and, as such, safety for the forthcoming campaign. The Seagulls went on another winless run of seven games towards the end of the season, however previous results proved enough to keep them six points above relegated Millwall in 22nd.

Pre-season

Friendlies

Statistics

|-
|colspan="14"|Players currently out on loan:

|-
|colspan="14"|Players who left the club during the season:

|}

Goalscorers

Disciplinary record

Competitions

Football League Championship

League table

Result by round

Matches
The fixtures for the 2014–15 season were announced on 18 June 2014 at 9am.

FA Cup

League Cup

The draw for the first round was made on 17 June 2014 at 10am. Brighton & Hove Albion were drawn at home to Cheltenham Town.

Transfers

In

Out

Loans in

Loans out

References

2014-15
Brighton and Hove Albion